Haberkorn is a German surname. Notable people with the surname include:

 Charles Haberkorn (1880–1966), American tug of war competitor and wrestler
 Federico Haberkorn (born 1994), Argentine footballer
 Leonardo Haberkorn (born 1963), Uruguayan journalist and writer
 Todd Haberkorn (born 1982), American actor, voice actor

German-language surnames